Venda or Tswetla was a Bantustan in northern South Africa, which is fairly close to the South African border with Zimbabwe to the north, while to the south and east, it shared a long border with another black homeland, Gazankulu. It is now part of the Limpopo province. Venda was founded as a homeland by the South African government for the Venda people, speakers of the Venda language. The United Nations and international community refused to recognise Venda (or any other Bantustan) as an independent state.

History

Venda was declared self-governing on 1 February 1973, with elections held later in the year. Further elections were held in July 1978. The territory was declared independent by the South African government on 13 September 1979 and its residents lost their South African citizenship. In common with the other Bantustans, its independence was not recognised by the international community.

Venda was initially a series of non-contiguous territories in the Transvaal, with one main part and one main exclave. Its capital, formerly at Sibasa, was moved to Thohoyandou (which included the old Sibasa administrative district) when Venda was declared independent in 1979. Prior to independence it was expanded to form one contiguous territory, with a total land area of 6,807 km² (2628 sq. mi.). In the 1984 elections the ruling Venda National Party retained its position as ruling party, beating the perpetual opposition Venda Independent People's Party (VIPP).

At independence in 1979, the population of Venda stood at about 200,000 people. The state was cut off from neighbouring Zimbabwe by the Madimbo corridor, patrolled by South African troops, to the North, and from nearby Mozambique by the Kruger National Park.

The first President of Venda, Patrick Mphephu, was also a Paramount Chief of the Vhavenda people; he was born and lived in Dzanani in Limpopo. His successor, Frank Ravele, was overthrown in a military coup by the Venda Defence Force in 1990, after which the territory was ruled by the Council of National Unity. Venda was re-incorporated into South Africa on 27 April 1994.

Institutions of education
In 1982, the University of Venda known as Univen was established as an institution of higher learning for the Vhavenda people.

Districts in 1991
Districts of the province and population at the 1991 census.
 Dzanani: 123,035
 Mutale: 244,532
 Thohoyandou: 136,089
 Vuwani: 55,141

Security forces

The Venda National Force was established with Venda’s independence in 1979 and included defence and other services such as police and prisons. Strange enough, traffic policing was part of this national force, but by 1981 it was transferred to the Department of Justice. The Fire Brigade was however still part of the Venda National Force although there were plans to transfer this to the civilian government.

See also
Heads of State of Venda
Venda people (Vhavenda), the ethnic group who live mostly in the Limpopo province in South Africa.
Venda Defence Force

References

Sources
Lahiff, E. (2000) An Apartheid Oasis?: Agriculture and Rural Livelihoods in Venda, Routledge. .

 
Bantustans in South Africa
States and territories established in 1973
1973 establishments in South Africa
1994 disestablishments in South Africa
Former republics
States and territories disestablished in 1994